Milkshake is the debut EP by British pop band Jaws. It features both of their singles and their B-sides up until when it was released, and a new single titled "Friend Like You", released on 31 March 2013.

The EP was released on 21 April 2013 through Rattlepop as a digital download. It was meant to be released on vinyl on the same date, but due to delay in the manufacturing of the vinyl made it be pushed to be released on 6 May. It was released on blue vinyl, limited to 250 copies. On August 27, 2013, it was released in Japan on CD. It was re-pressed on pink vinyl in December 2013, limited to 300 copies.

NME gave the EP a fairly positive review saying that Jaws were "making laziness look and sound good since April 2013," as well as saying "no-one has ever sounded so much like the internal monologue of a sunbathing cat."

Track listing 
A side
"Breeze" - 5:18 
"Donut" - 2:38
"Toucan Surf" - 4:49

B side
"Friend Like You" - 4:34
"Stay In" - 4:44
"Surround You" - 4:40

A  Sometimes referred to as "BreeZe"

Release history

References 

2013 EPs
Indie pop EPs
Jaws (band) albums